Jennifer Simpson (née Barringer; born August 23, 1986) is an American middle distance runner and steeplechaser. She represented the United States at the 2008 Beijing Olympics, 2012 London Olympics and 2016 Rio Olympics. She is a former American record holder for the 3000 metres steeplechase. In the 1500 metres, she won a gold medal at the 2011 World Championships, a silver medal at the 2013 and 2017 World Championships, and a bronze medal at the 2016 Olympic Games in Rio.

Running career

High school
As a student at Oviedo High School, Jenny Barringer was a 5-time state champion in track and 3-time state champion in cross country. On 3 February 2018, Oviedo High School renamed their track Jenny Simpson Track in her honor. She also set Florida high school records in the mile, two-mile, 5000 m, and three-mile. Barringer finished 3rd in San Diego's Foot Locker Cross Country Championships in 2003 behind winner Katelyn Kaltenbach of Colorado and Marie Lawrence of Nevada. In the regional, Barringer came on strong and won for the second straight year in identical times of 17:27, becoming the first Florida girl to ever win the Footlocker South regional twice. She finished 10th in San Diego's Footlocker cross country national championship in 2004.

Collegiate
At Colorado, Barringer won the 2006 NCAA Outdoor championship steeplechase in a time of 9:53.04. The following year, she won the USATF Outdoor steeplechase championship in 9:34.64.

She finished 7th in heats at IAAF World Outdoors in the steeplechase in a time of 9:51.04. She finished 7th at the NCAA Outdoors in 2007 in the steeplechase with a time of 9:59.81. She also ran at Drake Relays in the steeplechase in a time of 9:44.31. In April 2007, she finished 4th in 5,000m at Stanford in a time of 15:48.24.

At the time of her 2008 Olympic appearance, Barringer was enrolled at the University of Colorado. At the U.S. trials, Barringer qualified for the United States Olympic team by finishing third in the steeplechase.

Barringer qualified for the first women's steeplechase final in Olympic history by finishing third in her heat. She set a new American record of 9:22.26 in the final and placed ninth.

In 2009, she set NCAA records in the mile, 3000 m, and 5000 m indoors, 1500 m, 3000 m steeplechase and 5000 m outdoors.  She also topped her own American record in the steeplechase at the 2009 World Championships with a time of 9:12:50, finishing 5th overall.

While primarily a steeplechaser, she ran 3:59.90 in the 1500 m at the 2009 Prefontaine Classic. At the time of the event, this performance made her the third-fastest female 1500 m runner in U.S. track and field history.

Barringer came fifth at the 2009 World Championships in Athletics, running a North American record time of 9:12.50 minutes for the event. It is also the best mark by any athlete from the Americas. She was the 2009 US Champion in the steeplechase.

While at Colorado, she won the Honda Sports Award as the nation's best collegiate female track and field athlete in 2009.

Despite the fact that she could have signed a professional contract, Barringer returned to school in the fall of 2009 to compete in cross country.  On October 31, 2009, Barringer captured the Big 12 individual title,  running a 6-kilometer course in 20 minutes, 27.46 seconds.  She was favored to win the NCAA Cross Country Championship on November 23, 2009, but collapsed after leading for the first two miles. She wound up in 163rd place.  Barringer commented that she felt light headed all of a sudden.

Barringer won the Inaugural Bowerman Award in 2009. The Bowerman Award is given to college track's Athlete of the Year.

Professional
In January 2010, Barringer signed a multi-year endorsement deal with New Balance.  Barringer later changed coaches from her  University of Colorado at Boulder coach, Mark Wetmore, in favor of the Air Force Academy coach Juli Benson.

Barringer missed most of the 2010 season due to a stress reaction in her right femur. She married runner Jason Simpson on October 8, 2010, taking on Simpson as her last name from that date.

Simpson began the 2011 season strong, winning the mile and 3000 meters championships at the 2011 USA Indoor Track and Field Championships.   She qualified for the 2011 World Championships in Athletics by finishing second in the 1500 meters at the US Track and Field Championship.

Simpson won a gold medal at the 1500 meters at the  World Championships in a time of 4:05:40. She beat rivals Hannah England and Natalia Rodriguez.  Simpson's gold medal was considered a surprise. She became the first American woman to win the event since Mary Decker at the inaugural World Championships in 1983.

On July 1, 2012, Simpson qualified for the 2012 Summer Olympics with a third-place finish in the women's 1500 m at the 2012 United States Olympic Trials.  At the 2012 Summer Olympics, Simpson qualified for the 1500 meter semifinal in 4:13.89 but did not qualify for the final. She announced a return to coach Mark Wetmore in December 2012.

2013
Simpson claimed the USATF Outdoor 5000 meter title in 15:33.77 in the 95+ degree heat of Des Moines, Iowa on June 23.

Simpson won a silver medal at the 2013 World Championships in Moscow on August 15, 2013, in the 1500m with a time of 4:02.99.

Simpson won the September 22, 2013 Fifth Avenue Mile in 4:19.3.
 1st at Drake Relays 1500m (4:03.35)
 1st at USATF Oxy HP 800m (2:00.45)
 1st at USA Outdoors 5,000m (15:33.77)
 3rd at Madrid 800m (2:02.15)
 1st at Monaco 1500m (4:00.48)
 2nd at World Outdoor 1500m (4:02.99)
 7th at Zurich 5,000m (14:56.26)
 10th in Brussels 1500m (4:10.70)

2014

Simpson was runner-up at the Boston New Balance Indoor Grand Prix 2 mile after miscounting her laps to finish in 9:26.19 on February 8.

Simpson followed that performance with a 2nd-place finish in 27:57 at the US Cross Country Championship on February 15.

At the Prefontaine Classic on May 31, she improved her personal best in the 1500 to 3:58.28. Simpson won the 1500 meters at the 2014 USA Outdoor Track and Field Championships in 4:04.96. On July 4, Simpson became the 2nd fastest American 1500 meter runner by running 3:57.22 at a Diamond League race in Paris.  With two wins late in the season, including a dramatic diving finish at the Weltklasse Zürich, she won the 2014 IAAF Diamond League.

On September 13, 2014, Simpson repeated her 2013 win of the Fifth Avenue Mile in 4:19.4.

At the end of the year she was selected as the winner of the Jackie Joyner Kersee Award.
May 18: 4:00 2nd at Shanghai Diamond League
May 31: 3:58 4th place at Eugene Diamond League
June 14: 4:02 3rd at New York Diamond League
June 29: 4:04 1st USATF Champs
July 5: 3:57 2nd place at Paris Diamond League
August 21: 4:00 1st Stockholm Diamond League
August 28: 3:59 1st at Zurich Diamond League
Sept 5th: 8:29 4th at Brussels Diamond League
September 13: 4:19.4 at Fifth Avenue Mile

2015
Simpson won the Boston New Balance Indoor Grand Prix 2 mile in 9:18.35 on February 7, setting a new American record, 5 seconds ahead of Regina Jacobs' 2002 American record at the same event, 9:23.38.

At the Prefontaine Classic on May 30, she won in a season best in the 1500 opener to 4:00.28.

At the USA Outdoor Track and Field Championships in Eugene, Oregon Simpson won the 1500m in 4:14.86, and will represent the U.S. for the 1500m in the 2015 World Championships in Athletics in Beijing, China in August.

At the Herculis Diamond League meet at Stade Louis II in Monaco Simpson ran 3:57.30, just .18 off Mary Slaney's nearly 32-year-old American record before the race.  During that same race, a second ahead of her, Shannon Rowbury improved the American record to 3:56.29 and Genzebe Dibaba improved the world record to 3:50.07.

At the 2015 World Championships in Athletics – Women's 1500 metres in Beijing, China, Simpson finished 11th in the final round after losing her shoe and struggled, finishing in 4:16.28.

On September 11, at the Diamond League finale in Brussels, Simpson placed 4th in the mile in 4:22.18, just behind Shannon Rowbury who finished in 4:22.10.

On September 13, Simpson placed 1st in a time of 4:29.0 at New York Road Runners Fifth Avenue Mile in New York City. By the end of the year, she ran the 3000 meters standard for the 2016 IAAF World Indoor Championships in the 3000 metres at the Zürich Diamond League.

2016 
Simpson won a bronze medal in the 1500 meters at the 2016 Olympic Games in Rio, to become the first American woman to win an Olympic medal in that event.

On September 3, Simpson placed 1st in a time of 4:18.3 at the New York Road Runners Fifth Avenue Mile in New York City.

2017 
Simpson ran a 4:19.98 mile, finishing 5th at the London Anniversary Games on July 9, 2017, behind Hellen Obiri and Laura Muir, Winny Chebet and Angelika Cichocka, setting a personal record, and second fastest time ever for an American woman.

She won her second silver medal in the World Championships 1500m event on August 7, 2017, at the 2017 World Championships, finishing in 4:02.76, less than 0.2 seconds behind Faith Chepngetich Kipyegon.

Simpson capped her 2017 campaign with a record-setting win at the New York Road Runners Fifth Avenue Mile. In addition to achieving a record sixth Fifth Avenue title, she tied the longstanding meet record with a time of 4:16.6.

2018 
Simpson won the Fifth Avenue Mile again in 2018 making it six straight and seven total Fifth Avenue titles.

2019 
On September 8, Simpson bettered her best time for the Fifth Avenue Mile in the 2019 race, running 4:16.1, to give her sole possession of the event record.  It was her seventh straight win and her eighth title in the event.

2021 

On June 21, 2021, she finished tenth in the 2021 U.S Olympic Trials 1500 meter run with a time of 4:07.76, failing to qualify for the Tokyo Olympics. This is the first time she failed to make a national team since she made the team in 2007.

Competition record

International

National championships

NCAA championships

Diamond League wins
Herculis: 2013 (1500 m)
DN Galan: 2014 (1500 m)
Weltklasse Zürich: 2014 (1500 m)
Prefontaine Classic: 2015 (1500 m)
Golden Gala: 2015 (1500 m)

Personal bests

References

External links
 
 
 Diamond League profile
 NBC Olympics Profile

1986 births
Living people
American female middle-distance runners
American female steeplechase runners
Athletes (track and field) at the 2008 Summer Olympics
Athletes (track and field) at the 2012 Summer Olympics
Athletes (track and field) at the 2016 Summer Olympics
Colorado Buffaloes women's track and field athletes
People from Webster City, Iowa
People from Oviedo, Florida
World Athletics Championships medalists
Track and field athletes from Iowa
Sportspeople from Seminole County, Florida
Track and field athletes from Florida
World Athletics Championships athletes for the United States
Medalists at the 2016 Summer Olympics
Olympic bronze medalists for the United States in track and field
Colorado Buffaloes women's cross country runners
Diamond League winners
USA Outdoor Track and Field Championships winners
USA Indoor Track and Field Championships winners
World Athletics Championships winners